Mother Lode Union School District is a public school district based in El Dorado County, California, United States. Mother Lode Union School District was founded in 1954 in the conifer and oak foothills of California's Sierra Nevada's at an elevation of 1700 feet. The district consists of two schools; Indian Creek Elementary for students K-4 and Herbert Green Middle School with grades 5–8.

References

External links
 

School districts in El Dorado County, California
1954 establishments in California
School districts established in 1954